Shirley Russell may refer to:

 Shirley Ann Russell (1935–2002), British costume designer
 Shirley Russell (artist) (1886–1985), American painter
 Shirley Russell (rugby union), Australian rugby player